Curve is a magazine about industrial design and product design. Published quarterly since 2002, it features interviews and profiles with designers, product developers and manufacturers, as well as coverage of new materials, technologies and trends in industrial design.

Curve editions published from 2002 to 2014 can be viewed on the website in an online archive, open to the public and free of charge. The website also features a blog covering industrial design and product design news and the latest product technologies and innovations.

Curve was founded by industrial designer, Belinda Stening and published by Beesting Communications Pty Ltd based in Melbourne, Australia.

Notable designers profiled in Curve
 Alberto Alessi
 Chris Bangle
 Yves Béhar
 Christoph Behling
 Kazuo Kawasaki
 Rem Koolhaus
 Ravi Sawhney
 Peter Schreyer
 Marcel Wanders
 Peter Zec
 Zaha Hadid
 Stefano Marzano

References

External links
Curve website

Design magazines
English-language magazines
Magazines established in 2002
Quarterly magazines published in Australia
Magazines published in Melbourne
Arts magazines published in Australia